Sydney Simale Lokale (born 19 September 2000) is a Kenyan footballer who currently plays as a forward for KCB.

Career statistics

Club

Notes

International

References

2000 births
Living people
Kenyan footballers
Kenya international footballers
Association football forwards
Ulinzi Stars F.C. players
F.C. Kariobangi Sharks players
HIFK Fotboll players
Kenya Commercial Bank S.C. players
Kenyan expatriate footballers
Kenyan expatriate sportspeople in Finland
Expatriate footballers in Finland
People from Nakuru